Thayer–Martin agar (or Thayer–Martin medium, or VPN agar) is a Mueller–Hinton agar with 5% chocolate sheep blood and antibiotics. It is used for culturing and primarily isolating pathogenic Neisseria bacteria, including Neisseria gonorrhoeae and Neisseria meningitidis, as the medium inhibits the growth of most other microorganisms. When growing Neisseria meningitidis, one usually starts with a normally sterile body fluid (blood or CSF), so a plain chocolate agar is used.  Thayer–Martin agar was initially developed in 1964, with an improved formulation published in 1966.

Components
It usually contains the following combination of antibiotics, which make up the VPN acronym:

Vancomycin, which is able to kill most Gram-positive organisms, although some Gram-positive organisms such as Lactobacillus and Pediococcus are intrinsically resistant
Polymyxin, also known as colistin, which is added to kill most Gram-negative organisms except Neisseria, although some other Gram-negative organisms such as Legionella are also resistant
Nystatin, which can kill most fungi
Trimethoprim inhibits swarming of Proteus spp

Clinical implications
A negative culture on Thayer–Martin in a patient exhibiting symptoms of pelvic inflammatory disease most likely indicates an infection with Chlamydia trachomatis.

References

Microbiological media